Maninder Singh is an Indian professional Kabaddi player who plays for the India national kabaddi Team.He is the captain and lead raider of Bengal Warriors In the Pro Kabaddi League.Maninder is regarded as one of the best raiders in the league. He led Bengal Warriors to their maiden  PKL trophy in 2019.

Early life
Maninder Singh was born in the Hoshiarpur district of Punjab, India. He completed graduation from Khalsa College, Amritsar and currently lives in Jalandhar. He is employed to Punjab Police.

Career

Season 1
He started his career in the Pro Kabaddi League in 2014, playing for Jaipur Pink Panthers.
The team won the inaugural season of the league and statistically he was rated as the third best raider of the Season with 130 raid points.

Season 5
After this start to his career, he was injured and missed the next three seasons of the league before being bought by Bengal Warriors in 2017. 
He made a brilliant comeback and scored 190 raid Points in the season. He was a lethal raider on the mat and scored a lot of critical points for the side.

Season 6
He became the fastest raider to score 400 and 500 raid points in the 2018–19 Pro Kabaddi League season. He scored 206 raid points from 22 matches.

Season 7
In 2019, after not retaining PO Surjeet Singh who was their skipper for the past two seasons.
Maninder was announced as the captain for his team. In a match against Patna Pirates, he became the second quickest raider after Pardeep Narwal (63 matches) to reach 600 points (68 matches) in the PKL. He led his team to the playoffs averaging 10 raid points per match. But in the penultimate league stage, he dislocated his shoulder and became injured. Which saw him sit out the remaining matches including semi final and final. But in the final, the team got support with his presence as assistant coach. Despite his absence off the mat, Bengal Warriors clinched their first ever PKL title by beating Dabang Delhi in The Arena. Maninder was just 2 Points short from his career best performance. However, his best performance came against Jaipur Pink Panthers, when he picked up 19 raid points from 24 raids in the Warriors' 41-40 win that propelled his team to the playoffs. His average of 10.25 points per game in the season was the best of his vivo Pro Kabaddi career and his tally of six Super Raids was bettered by only three other raiders.

Season 8
In 2021–22 Pro Kabaddi League season, Maninder was retained as the captain of Bengal Warriors. In a match against U Mumba, he achieved a unique feat of having 100% raid contribution, scoring 17 raid points of his team alone. Maninder also achieved his career best 9 consecutive Super 10s (scoring 10 raid points in a match) in Season 8. on 24 January, in a match against Jaipur Pink Panthers, he became only the fourth player in Pro kabaddi history to cross the 900-raid point mark, second quickest (93 matches) after Pardeep Narwal. Despite Maninder's tremendous form, Bengal Warriors couldn't qualify for the playoffs.  He became the third best raider of PKL 8 with 262 raid points. Mani scored 16 Super 10s and executed 11 super raids  during the season. He proved himself as a multi-point raid specialist.

Season 9

Bengal Warriors retained Maninder as their captain in season 9 of PKL . In Warriors' opening match against Haryana Steelers, he became only the second player after Pardeep Narwal to reach 1000 raid points in the history of the Pro Kabaddi League . on November 5, Mani scored his career best 20 raid points in a single match to register a 45-50 victory against Gujarat Giants.

Career statistics

Raid statistics

References

External links

Living people
Indian kabaddi players
Pro Kabaddi League players
1990 births
People from Jalandhar district